Opened in 1975, McMinnville Civic Center is a 4,800-seat multi-purpose arena in McMinnville, Tennessee. It hosts various local concerts and sporting events for the area.

References

External links 
 Civic Center page on City of McMinnville website

Indoor arenas in Tennessee
Sports venues in Tennessee
Buildings and structures in Warren County, Tennessee
1975 establishments in Tennessee
Sports venues completed in 1975